The 2005-06 Minnesota Timberwolves season was the team's 17th in the NBA. They began the season hoping to improve upon their 44-38 output from the previous season. However, they came eleven wins shy of tying it, finishing 33-49 and missing the playoffs for the second straight season.

Draft picks

Roster

Regular season

Season standings

Record vs. opponents

Game log

Player statistics

Awards and records
 Kevin Garnett, All-NBA Third Team
 Kevin Garnett, NBA All-Defensive Second Team
 Kevin Garnett, J. Walter Kennedy Citizenship Award

Transactions

References

Minnesota Timberwolves seasons
2005 in sports in Minnesota
2006 in sports in Minnesota
Monnesota